Tremont Township may refer to the following townships in the United States:

 Tremont Township, Tazewell County, Illinois
 Tremont Township, Buchanan County, Missouri
 Tremont Township, Schuylkill County, Pennsylvania